Arturo Valencia (born 29 January 1951) is a Mexican water polo player. He competed at the 1972 Summer Olympics and the 1976 Summer Olympics.

References

1951 births
Living people
Mexican male water polo players
Olympic water polo players of Mexico
Water polo players at the 1972 Summer Olympics
Water polo players at the 1976 Summer Olympics
Place of birth missing (living people)
20th-century Mexican people
21st-century Mexican people